Berta Bonastre Peremateu (born 3 June 1992) is a Spanish field hockey forward who competed in the 2016 Summer Olympics. At the club level she plays in Belgium. In 2015, she received the Silver Stick award as the second best player in the Belgium's Athlon Hockey League. Her sister Silvia is also a field hockey player.

References

External links
 

1992 births
Living people
Spanish female field hockey players
Olympic field hockey players of Spain
Field hockey players at the 2016 Summer Olympics
Field hockey players at the 2020 Summer Olympics
Expatriate field hockey players
Spanish expatriates in Belgium
Female field hockey forwards
People from Vallès Occidental
Sportspeople from the Province of Barcelona
Field hockey players from Catalonia